Joines is a surname. Notable people with the surname include:

Allen Joines (born 1947), American politician
Jennifer Joines (born 1982), American volleyball player
Kimberly Joines (born 1981), Canadian alpine skier
Vernon Joines, American football player

See also
Joiner (surname)